Strange Fire is the debut studio album by American folk rock duo Indigo Girls. It was originally released independently on Indigo Records in Canada with eleven tracks. Epic Records signed the duo in 1988, and after their eponymous second album became a commercial success in early 1989, Epic re-released this album in the United States with a different running order, two tracks removed, and a new track, a cover of the 1960s hit "Get Together".

Strange Fire was certified gold by the RIAA in November 1996. The Epic version was remastered and reissued in 2000 with two bonus tracks.

Track listing

1989 Epic Records release (US)

2000 reissue bonus tracks

"Blood and Fire" was left off the Epic Records re-release in 1989 as it had already been included on the group's sophomore album Indigo Girls. "Land of Canaan" appears on both albums, but as two different recordings of the song. "High Horse" has never been re-released.

Personnel
Indigo Girls
Amy Ray - vocals, guitar
Emily Saliers - vocals, guitar
with:
Annie "Stan" Richardson - flute on "Crazy Game"
Nita Karpf - cello on "Left Me a Fool"
Sandy Garfinkle - harmonica on "I Don't Wanna Know" and "Land of Canaan"
Dede Vogt - mandolin on "I Don't Wanna Know"
Michelle Malone - vocals on "I Don't Wanna Know"

Notes 

1987 debut albums
Epic Records albums
Indigo Girls albums
Self-released albums
Albums produced by John Keane (record producer)